Heavyweights is a 1995 American  black comedy film directed by Steven Brill and written by Brill with Judd Apatow. The film follows a fat camp for kids that is taken over by a fitness guru named Tony Perkis (Ben Stiller).

Plot
When school ends for the summer, Gerry Garner’s parents send him to Camp Hope, a weight loss camp for boys. Initially reluctant, Gerry meets enthusiastic camp counselor Pat, and befriends the other campers, who have smuggled in enough junk food for the entire summer. The first night at Camp Hope brings the revelation that the original owners, the Bushkins, have declared bankruptcy and the camp has been bought by fitness entrepreneur Tony Perkis Jr, who plans to transform the camp’s weight loss program into a best-selling infomercial.

Tony replaces the camp’s beloved activities, including go-karts and ”the Blob”, with a punishing exercise regimen. Pat is replaced by the strict new counselor Lars, and the campers endure a painful softball game against their more athletic, over-competitive rivals, Camp MVP. When Tony purges the cabins’ hidden food caches, camper Josh stands up for Gerry by taunting Tony, and is sent home without a refund, which prompts the other campers to theorize about what happened to Josh after this. Tony arranges a dance with Camp Magnolia, a girls’ summer camp, to humiliate the boys into losing weight, but counselors Tim, Pat, and camp nurse Julie convince everyone to enjoy themselves together. Josh returns to Camp Hope, revealing that his father, a lawyer, threatened to sue Tony for kicking his son out without a refund.

Gerry and his friends sneak into Tony’s office in search of their confiscated snacks, and learn that Tony has intercepted all the campers’ letters to their families, including the letter that Gerry wrote to his grandmother. They discover a secret food stash used by most of the camp, leading them to gain weight, and Tony forces the boys on a twenty-mile hike, preparing to endanger their lives for the sake of fitness. The boys trick Tony into falling into a pit, and imprison him at camp in a makeshift cell, electrified with a bug zapper. With Pat, Julie, and Tim on their side, the campers take back control of Camp Hope, tying up Lars in the woods with Tony’s other counselors, and celebrating with a binge eating bonfire party. Tony's counselors, who are foreign, ultimately side with the campers due to threats of deportation.

The next morning, Pat rallies the campers to take responsibility for themselves and start losing weight, and they all start a healthier regimen while making Camp Hope fun again. The boys’ parents arrive for visiting day and are shown a video documenting Tony’s cruelty, which is interrupted by Tony, having escaped his cell. Exchanging blows with Gerry’s father, he attempts a series of backflips but knocks himself out. As Tony is taken away, his own father (a Western Pennsylvania lamp store guru whose fortune Tony uses to buy and fund the camp) arrives and promises to refund everyone’s money, but announces that the camp will be closed. The boys ask for the camp to stay open, and Pat – with eighteen years’ experience and the support of Gerry and the others – agrees to assume responsibility for Camp Hope.

Under Pat’s leadership, the campers restore their favorite activities, and prepare to face Camp MVP in their annual competition. Camp MVP takes the lead in the first event, an obstacle course, but Camp Hope catches up in the second round, a test of knowledge. In the final go-kart race, Gerry wins the competition for Camp Hope. Demonstrating that having fun is more important than winning, Pat throws the trophy in the lake, and seals his romance with Julie with a kiss. As Camp Hope celebrates their victory, Gerry thanks Pat for the best summer of his life.

In a post-credits scene, Tony has become an unsuccessful door-to-door salesman selling healing crystals.

Cast
 Aaron Schwartz as Gerald "Gerry" Garner
 Ben Stiller as Tony Perkis Jr. / Tony Perkis Sr., Tony's father
 Tom McGowan as Patrick "Pat" Finley
 Tim Blake Nelson as Roger Johnson
 Jeffrey Tambor as Maury Garner
 Joseph Wayne Miller as Samuel "Salami Sam" Dampier
 Jerry Stiller as Harvey Bushkin
 Anne Meara as Alice Bushkin
 Shaun Weiss as Josh Birnbaum
 Kenan Thompson as Roy Murphy
 David Bowe as Chris Donnelly
 Leah Lail as Julie Belcher
 Paul Feig as Tim Orford
 Tom Hodges as Lars
 Max Goldblatt as Phillip Grubenov
 Robert Zalkind as Michael Simms
 Patrick La Brecque as Dawson
 Nancy Ringham as Mrs. Garner
 Allen Covert as Kenny Parry, the cameraman
 Cody Burger as Cody Farley
 David Goldman as Nicholas Wales
 Judd Apatow as Homer Schulz
 Lauren Michelle Hill as Josie, the angelic girl
 Peter Berg as the chef (uncredited)

Production
Heavyweights was filmed over the course of two months in North Carolina at 2 separate camps, Camp Pinnacle and Camp Ton-A-Wandah.
Filming started on March 28, 1994 and finished on May 25, 1994.

Soundtrack
The film's original score was composed by J.A.C. Redford. A soundtrack was not released, but the film featured eleven songs:

Reception
Heavyweights received mixed reviews from critics. On review aggregator Rotten Tomatoes, the film holds an approval rating of 29%  based on 7 reviews, with an average score of 4.80/10. On Metacritic, the film received a score of 42 based on 16 reviews, indicating "mixed or average reviews". Audiences surveyed by CinemaScore gave the film a grade "A−" on scale of A to F.

According to Stephen Holden of The New York Times, "Heavyweights is really two movies in one, and they don't mesh. One movie is a no-holds-barred spoof of a Tony Little- or Susan Powter-style fitness merchant [...] The other movie is a conventional family comedy that pokes lighthearted fun at the chubby young campers."

In 2012, on the release of the Blu-ray, critic Brian Ordorff gave the film a grade "B" and wrote: "Time has been kind to the discarded fat camp movie, finding Heavyweights more digestible these days, after years spent processing the askew sense of humor shared by Apatow and Company."

Box office
The film made $17.6 million at box office and was not successful theatrically, though the film has garnered a cult following.

Home media
Heavyweights was released on VHS on August 15, 1995, LaserDisc on February 20, 1996, and released on DVD on March 4, 2003. Heavyweights was released on Blu-ray on December 11, 2012. It was also included on Disney+ in November 2019.

References

External links

 
 
 
 

1995 films
1990s children's comedy films
1990s buddy comedy films
American children's comedy films
Caravan Pictures films
Films directed by Steven Brill
Films produced by Joe Roth
Films produced by Roger Birnbaum
Films with screenplays by Steven Brill
Films shot in North Carolina
Films with screenplays by Judd Apatow
Films scored by J. A. C. Redford
Films about summer camps
Walt Disney Pictures films
Films about obesity
Films produced by Judd Apatow
1995 directorial debut films
1995 comedy films
1990s English-language films
1990s American films